Riot on Sunset Strip is a 1967 counterculture-era exploitation movie, released by American International Pictures. It was filmed and released within four months of the late-1966 Sunset Strip curfew riots.

The film stars Frank Alesia, Aldo Ray, Mimsy Farmer, Michael Evans, Anna Strasberg, Laurie Mock, Gene Kirkwood, Tim Rooney, and features musical appearances by The Standells and The Chocolate Watch Band. Earlier that year, Farmer, Mock and Kirkwood appeared in Hot Rods to Hell, where Farmer portrayed the bad girl and Mock a vulnerable virgin. In this film, they switched characters.

The film attempts to capture the essence of the period around the Sunset Strip riot, and also adds a subplot that revolves around a young girl's troubled relationship with her divorced parents. Her dosage with LSD by a would-be seducer, the subsequent 'acid trip' she experiences, and her later discovery by a police sergeant as the victim of gang rape, are among the movie's peak moments.

The film is now available on DVD through the MGM Limited Edition Collection.

Production notes
"Riot on Sunset Strip", a classic song in the genre of garage punk, was written for the film by Tony Valentino and John Fleck of the Standells.

The film was made for MGM but they could not move fast enough to release it so Katzman sold it to American International Pictures.

Cast
 Aldo Ray as Walt Lorimer
 Mimsy Farmer as Andrea Dollier
 Michael Evans as Frank Tweedy
 Laurie Mock as Liz-Ann Barbrey
 Tim Rooney as Grady Toss
 Bill Baldwin as Stokes
 Anna Strasberg as Helen Tweedy (credited as Anna Mizrahi)
 Hortense Petra as Margie
 Schuyler Hayden as Herbie
 Gene Kirkwood as Flip
 Pat Renella as Perry
 Forrest Lewis as Aynsley
 George E. Carey	as Arnow
 John Hart as Pritchard
 Dick Winslow as Curtis

See also
 List of American films of 1967
 Hippie exploitation films
 Captivity narratives
 Rape and revenge films

References

External links
 
 
 Review by Dennis Schwartz
  DVD available

American International Pictures films
1967 films
1967 drama films
American drama films
Films about hallucinogens
Films directed by Arthur Dreifuss
1960s English-language films
1960s American films